The Last is a 2019 American drama film written and directed by Jeff Lipsky and starring Reed Birney, A J Cedeño, Jill Durso, Julie Fain Lawrence and Rebecca Schull.

Cast
Rebecca Schull
Jill Durso
A J Cedeño
Reed Birney
Julie Fain Lawrence

Release
The film was released in theaters on March 29, 2019.

Reception
The film has  rating on Rotten Tomatoes.

Peter Debruge of Variety gave the film a negative review and wrote, "There’s something undeniably fearless in Lipsky’s filmmaking, which makes virtually no concessions to his audience. Still, he seems to have chosen the wrong medium to express himself, and it’s becoming all too clear that he’s not improving with practice."

Frank Scheck of The Hollywood Reporter gave the film a positive review and wrote, "To say that thespians live for opportunities such as this is an understatement, and Schull, whose restrained underplaying only makes the material more powerful, makes the most of it."

References

External links
 
 

American drama films
2010s English-language films
2010s American films
2019 drama films